Upendra Kant Aryal is 25th Chief of Nepal Police. He was appointed as the Chief of Nepal Police after succeeding Kuber Singh Rana on 16 November 2013 by the cabinet decision made on 11 November 2013. With this decision, he is also the Head of the National Central Bureau (NCB), Kathmandu, INTERPOL.

Born on 14 January 1962 in Siraha District, IGP Aryal completed his bachelor's degree in Humanities and Social Sciences from Tribhuvan University. After completing his academic degree, he commenced his career in Nepal Police as an Inspector on 15 February 1987. He was later promoted to Deputy Superintendent of Police (DSP) in 1993, Superintendent of Police (SP) in 2001 and Senior Superintendent of Police (SSP) in 2006.

Upon his promotion to Deputy Inspector General (DIG) on 7th Oct, 2009, he was assigned to the Operation Department, Police Headquarters (PHQ) and later took command of the Western Regional Police Office, Pokhara where his office was awarded with the Police Baton 2068 for their outstanding work efficiency in the inter-regional competition. His other responsibilities as a DIG include Director of Central Investigation Bureau, Chief of Metropolitan Traffic Division, and Chief of Eastern Regional Police Office, Biratnagar. Adjudging his strategic and managerial acumen, he was appointed as the Additional Inspector General (AIG) of Police on 31 October 2013. As the Chief of Operation Department, he headed the Central Election Cell of Nepal Police and was involved in the Strategic Security Planning Management for Constituent Assembly Election 2013 despite his short spell.

In his 27 years of professional service, he has taken part in numerous national and international trainings, programs and workshops. In recognition to his outstanding service, he was decorated with the Suprabal Janasewa Shree Padak from Rt. Hon. President of Nepal, Dr. Ram Baran Yadav. Addition to these honours, he has also been bestowed with 11 other decorations and medals. He was also awarded by the Letter of appreciation from INTERPOL in 2010 for his outstanding performance to control trans-international crimes.

IGP Aryal has established himself as an honest, hardworking and highly professional police officer who envisages a fair and competent police service reiterating zero tolerance against corruption and incompliance. He prioritizes on institutional strengthening, fair and speedy service delivery, and protection/promotion of human rights in order to establish Nepal Police as a people-centric institution that is efficient, competent and accountable.

IGP Aryal stresses teamwork and partnership to be the driving force for achieving these goals through mutual trust and respect with all members of the organization. He believes that collective initiation and constructive support of all stakeholders of the society as the foundation to propel Nepal Police as a more accountable and serviceable institution of the state.

References

External links
 Nepal Police official website
 Nepal Police official facebook website

1962 births
Living people
People from Siraha District
Nepalese police officers
Inspectors General of Police (Nepal)
Tribhuvan University alumni
Khas people